Glay Rare Collectives Vol. 1 and 2 are the third and fourth released collection albums from the Japanese rock band, Glay. Unlike Review and Drive: Glay Complete Best, these two double disc CDs feature all of the B sides from their singles that were released from their debut to "mata koko de aimashou" as well as some other songs originally used for different works and not featured in any of their albums or singles. The first volume features the original song "Shiawase ni naru, sono toki ni", while the second volume featured the then newly released song "Itsuka".

Track listing

Volume 1 
Disc 1

Innocence
Regret
Gone with the Wind
Acid Head
Believe in fate
Together (new version with orchestra)
Haru wo ai suru hito (春を愛する人)
I'm Yours
Little Lovebirds
Doku Rokku (Rock) (毒ロック)
Sutoroberii Sheiku (Strawberry Shake) (ストロベリーシェイク)
It's Dying It's Not Dying
Shiwase ni naru, sono toki ni (幸せになる、その時に)
Disc 2
Innocence (Live Version 1995.6.12 in Shibuya Kokaido）
Mitsumeteitai (見つめていたい, from Glay Tour '98 pure soul Pamphlet CD）
Sabaibaru (Survival) (サバイバル, Live Version 99.3.10 In Tokyo Dome)
Misery (from Hide Tribute Spirits）
Misery (Glay Expo'99 Survival Live Version)
Koko dewanai, dokoka e (ここではない、どこかへ, Glay Expo'99 Survival Live Version)
Hitohira no jiyuu (ひとひらの自由, Glay Expo 2001 "Global Communication In Kyushu Version)

Volume 2 
Disc 1
Young Oh! Oh!
Hello My Life
Summer FM
Rock Icon
Good Bye Bye Sunday
Time
Why Don't We Make You Happy
Good Morning N.Y.C
Back Up
Super Ball 425
Sotsugyou made, ato sukoshi (卒業まで、あと少し)
Brothel Creepers
Itsuka (いつか)
Disc 2
17bars (Instrumental)
Cynical
Neuromancer
Ai (アイ)
Surf Rider
Giant Strong Faust Super Star
17ans
I'm Yours (Knightmare mix'99)
Dosanko shiisaa (道産子シーサー)

Chart information 
Volume One
Oricon Top Ranking: #3
Weeks on: 11
Overall Glay Ranking: #12
Volume Two
Oricon Top Ranking: #2
Weeks on: 11
Overall Glay Ranking: #11
(NOTE: Overall Glay Ranking is how it is ranked against Glay's other albums according to the Oricon)

References 
 Oricon - Glay's profile on the Oricon
 Happy Swing Space Site - Official Site

Glay albums
2003 greatest hits albums